The Globe was a newspaper in Toronto, Ontario, Canada, founded in 1844 by George Brown as a Reform voice. It merged with The Mail and Empire in 1936 to form The Globe and Mail.

History
The Globe is pre-dated by a title of the same name, which ran from 1840 to 1841; they are of no relation.

The Globe began as a weekly newspaper on March 5, 1844, edited by George Brown, a Presbyterian immigrant from Scotland by way of New York City, where he and his father had edited newspapers. In August 1844, it began to be printed on the first cylinder press in Canada West. The press was able to print 1,250 papers in one hour, many more than the old Washington hand press which could only produce 200 an hour. In September 1846, the Globe became a semi-weekly, in 1849 it became weekly again, and soon tri-weekly editions were established. The first office the Globe occupied was on the south-west corner of King and Jordan streets on property that was transferred to him from Angus Dallas in 1850.  The Globe was responsible for launching the careers of many men who went on to make their names famous including, Erastus Wiman, William Edwards, and Charles Harcourt.

The Globe was popular for providing information on the anti-slavery movements in the United States, Great Britain, and the British North American colonies during the 1840s and 1850s and was one of the leading advocates of the Canadian anti-slavery movement.  Brown filled his editorials with vehement ridicule of the Catholic Church, Jesuits, priests, nunneries, and every medieval superstition he could blame on the city's Irish and French Catholics. By 1872, The Globe was the leading newspaper of the country, with a weekly circulation of over 45,000 including dailies and weeklies.

The Globe was also known for having some of the most current news of the time.  During the Crimean War, before the era of the Atlantic cable, the Globe boasted great sales on European mail days. When the cable was established a reporter for the Globe, a Mr. Houston, was able to get the scoop on the England elections and release a special edition.

After the death of George Brown in 1882, John Cameron took over as editor.

Radical alignment and expansion
By the 1850s, The Globe was an independent newspaper and moved toward a radical, Clear Grit position. The first overseas correspondent from a Toronto newspaper was sent to Great Britain in 1851 by The Globe. On October 1, 1853, The Daily Globe appeared, and from 1861 to 1911 both morning and evening editions were published. In 1855, the Globe acquired both The Examiner and The North American.

Emergence of The Globe and Mail
In 1936 it absorbed The Mail and Empire to form The Globe and Mail.

See also
 History of Canadian newspapers
 List of newspapers in Canada

References

Further reading
 Bélanger, Claude. "George Brown", in L’Encyclopédie de l’histoire du Québec / The Quebec History Encyclopedia. (Marianopolis College, March 2006) online
Careless, J.M.C. Brown of the Globe: Volume One: Voice of Upper Canada 1818-1859 (1959) online 
Careless, J.M.C. Brown of the Globe: Volume Two: Statesman of Confederation 1860-1880. (Vol. 2. Dundurn, 1996) excerpt
 Careless, J. M. S. "BROWN, GEORGE," in Dictionary of Canadian Biography, vol. 10, University of Toronto/Université Laval, 2003–, accessed November 18, 2015, online
 Careless, J.M.C. "George Brown and Confederation," Manitoba Historical Society Transactions, Series 3, Number 26, 1969-70 online
 Careless, J.M.C. "The Toronto Globe and Agrarian Radicalism, 1850–67." Canadian Historical Review 29#1 (1948): 14-39.
 Creighton, Donald G. "George Brown, Sir John Macdonald, and the “Workingman”." Canadian Historical Review (1943) 24#4 pp: 362-376.
 Gabriele, Sandra, and Paul Moore. "The Globe on Saturday, The World on Sunday: Toronto Weekend Editions and the Influence of the American Sunday Paper, 1886-1895." Canadian Journal of Communication 34#3 (2009).  online
 Gauvreau, Michael. "Reluctant Voluntaries: Peter and George Brown: The Scottish Disruption and the Politics of Church and State in Canada." Journal of religious history 25.2 (2001): 134-157.
 Stabile, Julie. "The Economics of an Early Nineteenth-Century Toronto Newspaper Shop." Papers of The Bibliographical Society of Canada 41#1 (2003).
 Zerker, Sally. "George Brown and the printers' union." Journal of Canadian Studies 10#1 (1975): 42+

Newspapers published in Toronto
Publications established in 1844
Defunct newspapers published in Ontario
Publications disestablished in 1936
The Globe and Mail
Liberalism in Canada
Weekly newspapers published in Ontario
1844 establishments in Canada
1936 disestablishments in Ontario